Bokovino is a rural locality (a village) in Aserkhovskoye Rural Settlement, Sobinsky District, Vladimir Oblast, Russia. The population was 4 as of 2010.

Geography 
Bokovino is located 14 km east of Sobinka (the district's administrative centre) by road. Mosyagino is the nearest rural locality.

References 

Rural localities in Sobinsky District